Thomas Gifford was an American author.

Thomas Gifford may also refer to:
Thomas Gifford (politician) (1854–1935), politician in British Columbia, Canada
Thomas Carlyle Gifford (1881–1975)
Thomas Gifford of the Gifford baronets

See also
Gifford (disambiguation)